The thick-billed seedeater (Crithagra burtoni) is a species of finch in the family Fringillidae.  It is found in Angola, Burundi, Cameroon, Democratic Republic of the Congo, Kenya, Nigeria, Rwanda, Tanzania, and Uganda.

The thick-billed seedeater was formerly placed in the genus Serinus but phylogenetic analysis using mitochondrial and nuclear DNA sequences found that the genus was polyphyletic. The genus was therefore split and a number of species including the thick-billed seedeater were moved to the resurrected genus Crithagra.

References

thick-billed seedeater
Birds of Sub-Saharan Africa
Birds of the Gulf of Guinea
Birds of Central Africa
Birds of East Africa
thick-billed seedeater
thick-billed seedeater
Taxonomy articles created by Polbot